"The 500 Greatest Albums of All Time" is a 2013 special issue of British magazine NME, available digitally or in newsstands on October 23. The list presented was compiled based on votes from current and past NME journalists. The list and writer's choices voting several times for the same act, were criticized by several papers including The Guardian.

The number one album was The Queen Is Dead by the Smiths.

Background 
Made in a similar fashion to the Rolling Stones 500 Greatest Albums of All Time, the list was voted for by NME journalists past and present, each of whom submitted a weighted list of 50 albums.

Reception
This NME listing was criticized by the media. The Guardian noted that NMEs Features Editor in 2013, Laura Snapes, rated in her top four spots four albums by the same band, the National. Snapes included a fifth National album at number 7 in her top ten greatest albums of all time. Similarly another NME journalist, Kevin EG Perry, also selected four albums by the same band in his top four spots, this time the Rolling Stones.

Ben Kaye of Consequence of Sound wrote that "if Laura Snapes had her wish, the top four would all be The National albums". He wrote:
The Smiths' The Queen Is Dead is the greatest album of all time. It's better than anything the Beatles ever did (though Revolver came close). Meanwhile, the band Queen is nowhere on the list at all, whereas Queens of the Stone Age shows up thrice (they also show up Thrice, who don't appear). Some other interesting highlights include Oasis' Definitely Maybe starting the top 10, PJ Harvey's Let England Shake making an impressive No. 15, Arcade Fire's Funeral (13) slotting higher than My Bloody Valentine's Loveless (18), and Outkast's Stankonia only good enough to slip in at 500.

More oddities: The highest ranked Michael Jackson album (Thriller) hits at 131, while LCD Soundsystem broke the top 50 with Sound of Silver (49). It's rad that Jimmy Eat World's Bleed American (429) made it on, but having it one spot below Bruce Springsteen's Born in the U.S.A. and two above Soundgarden's Badmotorfinger seems kinda crazy. Speaking of the Boss, Nebraska (148) isn’t quite as good as Frank Ocean’s Channel Orange (147), but slightly better than Elliott Smith's Either/Or (149) and The Streets Original Pirate Material (150). Also, apparently Arctic Monkeys' one-month-old AM (449) is already better than Big Star's Third (451).
He also pointed out the differences between the list and the Top 100 British Albums Ever, released by NME in 2006. Michael Nelson of Stereogum thought the top three albums were a good choice, but said the rest was "a waking nightmare."

Statistics

See also
 Album era
 [[Rolling Stone's 500 Greatest Albums of All Time|Rolling Stone'''s 500 Greatest Albums of All Time]], a similar list
 All Time Top 1000 Albums'', a similar list

References

External links
 ''NME'''s The 500 Greatest Albums Of All Time: 100-1
 ''NME'''s The 500 Greatest Albums Of All Time: 200-101
 ''NME'''s The 500 Greatest Albums Of All Time: 300-201
 ''NME'''s The 500 Greatest Albums Of All Time: 400-301
 ''NME'''s The 500 Greatest Albums Of All Time: 500-401

Lists of albums
Magazine articles
2013 in music
New Musical Express